Eastbury is a settlement in the Three Rivers district of Hertfordshire, adjacent to the Greater London suburb of Northwood in Hillingdon. Other settlements nearby include Moor Park and South Oxhey, and Eastbury is about equal distance between the Northwood and Moor Park tube stations (Metropolitan line). Northwood Headquarters is in Eastbury. The post town is Northwood. It is in the Three Rivers Ward of Moor Park and Eastbury

Eastbury is served by Eastbury Farm JMI School. This was rated in 2007 as Outstanding by Ofsted and is one of the top 1% primary schools in England.

References

Hamlets in Hertfordshire
Three Rivers District